Weequahic Golf Course (pronounced we-QWAY-ik) is an 18-hole public course located in the Dayton neighborhood of Newark, New Jersey.

Designed in 1913 by George Low, it is the oldest public golf course in New Jersey. The word "Weequahic" is from the Lenni-Lenape Native American term for "head of the cove". The course sits next to the 311 acre (1.3 km²) Olmsted Brothers-designed Weequahic Park, which features a 2.2-mile rubberized jogging path around its 80-acre (324,000 m²) lake. It is also adjacent to Evergreen Cemetery, an  American cemetery and located at 1137 North Broad Street, Hillside.

The course is home to golf pro legend Wiley Williams, who was one of the first African-American golfers to win a major New Jersey golf event and worked to introduce city youth to the sport. The course is also home to the First Tee Program of Essex County which teaches youth to golf.

The course was described in 2016 by the Golf Channel as a "hidden gem."

References

External links
 http://www.weequahicpark.com
 http://www.newarkhistory.com/weequahicpark.html Newark history: Weequahic Park
 County of Essex: Weequahic Park
 Video from East Coast Greenway about Weequahic Park

Geography of Newark, New Jersey
Parks in Essex County, New Jersey
Tourist attractions in Newark, New Jersey
Golf clubs and courses in New Jersey
1913 establishments in New Jersey